Ras-related protein Rab-5C is a protein that in humans is encoded by the RAB5C gene. RAB5C belongs to the Ras-related protein family.

References

Further reading